The 2023 Africa U-17 Cup of Nations qualification was a men's under-17 football competition which decided the participating teams of the 2023 Africa U-17 Cup of Nations.

Players born 1 January 2006 or later were eligible to participate in the competition. A total of twelve teams qualified to play in the final tournament, including Algeria who qualified automatically as hosts.

Teams

Since the 2021 Africa U-17 Cup of Nations was cancelled, this will be the first edition in Africa U-17 Cup of Nations to have expanded to 12 teams instead of eight. Each of the six zones received two spots in the final tournament.

Notes
Teams in bold qualified for the final tournament.
(H): Qualifying tournament hosts
(Q): Automatically qualified for final tournament regardless of qualification results
(W): Withdrew
(D): Disqualified

Schedule
The qualifying competition was split into regional competitions, with the teams entering the qualifying tournament of their zone. The schedule of each qualifying zone was as follows.

North Zone

The 2022 UNAF U-17 Tournament, which also served as the qualifiers for the Africa U-17 Cup of Nations, took place between 8 to 14 November 2022 in Algiers, Algeria. The four teams were placed in one group, with the winners qualifying for the final tournament. Algeria didn't participate in the tournament, as were automatically qualified for the final tournament as hosts.

All times are local, DPRA (UTC+1).

<onlyinclude>

West A Zone
The WAFU-UFOA Zone A qualifiers for the Africa U-17 Cup of Nations were hosted by Mauritania with the matches played between 1 and 9 October 2022. The draw was announced on 21 July 2022.

All times are local, GMT (UTC±0).

Group stage
The six teams were drawn into two groups of three teams. The winners and the runners-up of each group advanced to the semi-finals.

Group A

Group B

Knockout stage

Semi-finals
Winners qualified for 2023 Africa U-17 Cup of Nations.

Final

West B Zone
The WAFU-UFOA Zone B qualifiers for the Africa U-17 Cup of Nations were hosted by Ghana with the matches played between 11 and 24 June 2022. The draw was announced on 15 April 2022.

All times are local, GMT (UTC±0).

Group stage
The seven teams were drawn into two groups of three and four teams. The winners and the runners-up of each group advanced to the semi-finals.

Group A

Group B

Knockout stage

Semi-finals
Winners qualified for 2023 Africa U-17 Cup of Nations.

Third place

Final

Central Zone
The UNIFFAC qualifiers for the Africa U-17 Cup of Nations were planned to be held in Cameroon between 7–12 January 2023 but was postponed and eventually played between 12–18 January 2023 due to a number of players being deemed overage by the MRI tests for Chad, DR Congo and Cameroon.

Central-East Zone

The CECAFA qualifiers for the Africa U-17 Cup of Nations were hosted by Ethiopia, with the matches played between 2 and 19 October 2022. The draw was announced on 15 September 2022.

All times are local, EAT (UTC+3).

Group stage
The ten teams were initially drawn into two groups of five teams. Ethiopia, Tanzania, Somalia, South Sudan and Eritrea were drawn into Group A and Uganda, Djibouti, Sudan, Burundi and Rwanda were drawn into Group B. However, on 26 September, Eritrea and Rwanda withdrew from the competition, leaving both the groups with four teams. On 1 October, Djibouti and Sudan were disqualified from the tournament after some of their players failed the MRI test, leaving Group B with only two teams.

A redraw was then conducted on 2 October, with three teams drawn in two groups. The winners and the runners-up of each group advanced to the semi-finals.

Group A

Group B

Knockout stage

Semi-finals
Winners qualified for 2023 Africa U-17 Cup of Nations.

Third place

Final

South Zone

The COSAFA qualifiers for the Africa U-17 Cup of Nations were played between 2 and 11 December 2022 in Malawi. The draw was announced on 4 November 2022.

All times are local, CAT (UTC+2).

Group stage
The nine teams were initially drawn into three groups of three teams. Malawi, Botswana and Namibia were drawn into Group A; Angola, South Africa and Mauritius were drawn into Group B; and Zambia, Mozambique and Seychelles were drawn into Group C.

However, a few days later, Mauritius withdrew from the competition, leaving Group B with only two teams. A redraw was then conducted on 29 November, with eight teams drawn into two groups of four teams. The winners and the runners-up of each group advanced to the semi-finals.

Group A

Group B

Knockout stage

Semi-finals
Winners qualified for 2023 Africa U-17 Cup of Nations.

Third place

Final

Qualified teams
The following 12 teams qualified for the final tournament.

1 Bold indicates champions for that year. Italic indicates hosts for that year.

Goalscorers

See also 
 2023 Africa U-20 Cup of Nations qualification

Notes

References

U-17 Championship qualification
2022 in youth association football
Qualification
2023
Association football events postponed due to the COVID-19 pandemic